The Château de Noironte is a castle located in the French commune of Noironte in the Doubs department and the Bourgogne-Franche-Comté region. It has been listed since 1992 as a monument historique by the French Ministry of Culture.

See also
List of castles in France
Noironte

References

Bibliography
 Courtieu, Jean (1986). Dictionnaire des communes du département du Doubs. Besançon: Cêtre. .

Noironte
Monuments historiques of Bourgogne-Franche-Comté